Guay is a surname. Notable people with the surname include:

 Albert Guay (1917–1951), Canadian mass murderer
 Annie Guay (born 1985), Canadian ice hockey player
 Erik Guay (born 1981), Canadian alpine ski racer
 Florian Guay, politician in Quebec
 François Guay (born 1968), professional ice hockey centre
 Gabriel Guay (1848–1923), French painter
 Jacob Guay (born 1999), Canadian young singer
 Joseph-Philippe Guay (1915–2001), Canadian parliamentarian
 Lucie Guay (born 1958), Canadian sprint kayaker
 Monique Guay (born 1959), Quebec politician
 Paul Guay (born 1963), American professional ice hockey player
 Pierre Malcom Guay (1848–1899), physician, surgeon and political figure in Quebec
 Raynald Guay (1933–2017), Liberal party member of the Canadian House of Commons
 Rebecca Guay, artist specializing in watercolor painting and illustration
 Richard Guay (disambiguation), multiple people
 Tom Guay (born 1965), guitar player who joined White Zombie